Buzzcocks is the seventh studio album by English pop punk band Buzzcocks. It was released on 18 March 2003 by record label Merge in the US and Cherry Red in the UK.

Critical reception 

Buzzcocks has received a mixed-to-favourable response from critics. AllMusic opined, "If Buzzcocks doesn't reinvent this band, it does give their approach a bit of an overhaul, and the results make for an album which holds onto their strengths while lending a more mature perspective to their work; hard to imagine Rancid having anything this interesting up their sleeve twenty-seven years down the line from their first recording." Entertainment Weekly's review was favourable, writing "it's nice to hear that middle age hasn't diminished the songwriting skills of original 'Cocks Pete Shelley and Steve Diggle."

Stylus Magazine, on the other hand, gave the album their lowest possible score of F, opining that the album sounds like "third-generation Green Day".

Track listing 
 "Jerk" (Pete Shelley) – 2:21
 "Keep On" (Shelley) – 3:19
 "Wake Up Call" (Steve Diggle) – 3:19
 "Friends" (Shelley) – 2:57
 "Driving You Insane" (Diggle) – 2:24
 "Morning After" (Shelley) – 2:34
 "Sick City Sometimes" (Diggle) – 2:59
 "Stars" (Howard Devoto, Shelley) – 2:46
 "Certain Move" (Diggle) – 3:02
 "Lester Sands" (Devoto, Shelley) – 2:47
 "Up for the Crack" (Diggle) – 2:23
 "Useless" (Shelley) – 4:01

Personnel 
Adapted from the album liner notes.

Buzzcocks
 Pete Shelley – guitar, vocals
 Steve Diggle – guitar, vocals
 Tony Barber – bass guitar
 Philip Barker – drums
Technical
Tony Barber – producer
Harvey Birrell – engineer
Duncan Cowell – mastering
Paul Burgess – sleeve layout
Chris Bushnell – sleeve layout
Buzzcocks – sleeve concept

References

External links 

 

2003 albums
Buzzcocks albums